The Constitutional Union Party or Constitutional Union of Cuba was a loyalist conservative political party in Cuba during Spanish colonial times.

References

Defunct political parties in Spain
Defunct political parties in Cuba
Political history of Cuba
Political parties established in 1878
Political parties disestablished in 1898
1878 establishments in Cuba
1878 establishments in Spain
1898 disestablishments in Cuba
1898 disestablishments in Spain
Conservative parties